Ishitegawa Dam is a gravity dam located in Ehime Prefecture in Japan. The dam is used for flood control, irrigation and water supply. The catchment area of the dam is 72.6 km2. The dam impounds about 50  ha of land when full and can store 12800 thousand cubic meters of water. The construction of the dam was started on 1966 and completed in 1972.

References

Dams in Ehime Prefecture
1972 establishments in Japan